Notable association football players with the name Diego include:

Argentina
 Diego Klimowicz (born July 1974), forward
 Diego Latorre (born August 1969), striker
 Diego Maradona (born October 1960 - November 2020), midfielder
 Diego Milito (born June 1979), striker
 Diego Rivero (born August 1981), winger
 Diego Simeone (born April 1970), midfielder

Bolivia
 Diego Bengolea (born December 1979), midfielder

Brazil
 Diego (footballer, born 1979) (Diego Costa Silva), goalkeeper
 Diego (footballer, born 1982) (Diego Salgado Costa de Menezes), goalkeeper
 Diego (footballer, born 1985) (Diego Ribas da Cunha), midfielder
 Diego (footballer, born April 1986) (Diego Aparecido Ferreira Oliveira), goalkeeper
 Diego (footballer, born May 1986) (Diego Dionatas dos Santos Oliveira), goalkeeper
 Diego (footballer, born 1988) (Diego Rigonato Rodrigues), left back
 Diego (footballer, born September 1995) (Diego Jara Rodrigues), left back
 Diego (footballer, born October 1995) (Jackson Diego Ibraim Fagundes), right back and midfielder
 Diego Alves (born June 1985), goalkeeper
 Diego Barcelos (born April 1985), striker
 Diego Benedito Galvão Máximo (born April 1986), defender
 Diego Cavalieri (born December 1982), goalkeeper
 Diego Clementino (born March 18, 1984), striker
 Diego Costa (born October 1988), Brazilian-Spanish striker
 Diego da Costa Menezes (born February 1982), goalkeeper
 Diego Giaretta (born November 1983), defender
 Diego Loureiro (born July 1998), goalkeeper
 Diego Oliveira De Queiroz (born June 1990), striker
 Diego Pereira Corrêa (born September 1983), left back
 Diego Souza (disambiguation), various footballers
 Diego Tardelli (born May 1985), striker
 Diego Walsh (born December 1979), Brazilian-American midfielder

Colombia
 Diego Serna (born October 1973), forward

Chile
 Diego Cayupil, Chilean Footballer

Ecuador
 Diego Calderón (born October 1986), defender
 Diego Herrera (born April 1969), forward

Mexico
 Diego Martínez (born February 1981), right back

Portugal
 Diego (footballer, born 1989) (Diego Martins da Costa e Silva), goalkeeper

Spain
 José Diego Álvarez (born November 1954), midfielder
 Diego Capel (born February 1988), winger
 Diego Tristán (born January 1976), striker

Uruguay
 Diego Alonso (born April 1975), striker
 Diego Cor (born July 2000), forward
 Diego de Souza Carballo (born May 1984), midfielder
 Diego Fagúndez (born February 1995), midfielder
 Diego Forlán (born May 1979), striker
 Diego Godín (born February 1986), defender
 Diego Laxalt (born February 1993), defender
 Diego Lugano (born November 1980), defender
 Diego Pérez (born May 1980), midfielder
 Diego Polenta (born February 1992), defender
 Diego Rodríguez (footballer, born 1989) (born September 1989), midfielder
 Diego Rolán (born March 1993), striker
 Diego Rossi (born March 1998), forward
 Diego Sebastián Ribas (born June 1980), midfielder
 Diego Zabala (born September 1991), midfielder

See also
 Diego (given name)
 Diego (surname)